The Glorious Trail is a 1928 American silent Western film directed by Albert S. Rogell and starring Ken Maynard, Gladys McConnell and Frank Hagney.

Cast
 Ken Maynard as Pat O'Leary
 Gladys McConnell as Alice Harper
 Frank Hagney as Gus Lynch
 James Bradbury Jr. as Bill Keller
 Billy Franey as Jimmy Bacon
 Chief Yowlachie as High Wolf 
 Les Bates as Telegrapher

References

External links
 

1928 films
1928 Western (genre) films
1920s English-language films
American black-and-white films
First National Pictures films
Films directed by Albert S. Rogell
Silent American Western (genre) films
1920s American films